Jakob Johann Anton Schgraffer (May 15, 1799 in Bozen – March 23, 1859) was a Tyrolean composer and coffee house owner. He studied at Milan Conservatory under Vincenzo Federici.

Works
His best known work, revived and recorded in 2012, is the oratorio Die Angst und der Tod des Erlösers. Other works include:
 Laura betet. Engelharfen, B-Dur. Die Bethende Laura. Gedicht von Matthison, Music von J. Schgraffer

References

External links
 Provincial Archives website: Jakob Johann Schgraffer 

1799 births
1859 deaths
Milan Conservatory alumni